San Filippo del Mela (Sicilian: San Filippu) is a comune (municipality) in the Metropolitan City of Messina in the Italian region Sicily, located about  east of Palermo and about  west of Messina.

San Filippo del Mela borders the following municipalities: Merì, Milazzo, Pace del Mela, Santa Lucia del Mela.

Twin towns
 Castions di Strada, Italy

People
 Giuseppe Basile (1886–1977)

References

External links
 Official website
 www.santaluciadelmela.net
 http://www.stradadelvinomessina.it 

Cities and towns in Sicily